Limnius volckmari is a species of beetle belonging to the family Elmidae.

It is native to Europe.

References

Elmidae